The 1989–90 NBA season was the Hawks' 41st season in the National Basketball Association, and 22nd season in Atlanta. Injuries would hamper the Hawks again, as Doc Rivers only played just 48 games due to a herniated disk in his back. Despite the injuries, they went on a 7-game winning streak in December with a 13–6 record. However, in January they lost six consecutive games falling below .500, holding a 22–24 record at the All-Star break, and endangering their playoff chances. At midseason, the team traded Antoine Carr to the Sacramento Kings in exchange for Kenny Smith. The Hawks would close out the season on a strong note winning ten of their final 15 games finishing sixth in the Central Division with a 41–41 record. However, they ended up one game short of the playoffs.

Dominique Wilkins averaged 26.7 points, 6.5 rebounds and 1.6 steals per game, and was selected for the 1990 NBA All-Star Game, but was not selected to an All-NBA Team at season's end, while Moses Malone averaged 18.9 points and 10.0 rebounds per game, and Rivers provided the team with 12.5 points, 5.5 assists and 2.4 steals per game. In addition, Kevin Willis provided with 12.4 points and 8.0 rebounds per game, while John Battle contributed 10.9 points per game, and Spud Webb averaged 9.2 points, 5.8 assists and 1.3 steals per game off the bench. Wilkins also won the Slam Dunk Contest during the All-Star Weekend in Miami, with Smith (then with the Kings), finishing second behind Wilkins.

Following the season, Smith was traded to the Houston Rockets, while Cliff Levingston signed as a free agent with the Chicago Bulls, and head coach Mike Fratello resigned after coaching the Hawks for seven seasons.

Draft picks

Roster

Regular season

Season standings

z - clinched division title
y - clinched division title
x - clinched playoff spot

Record vs. opponents

Game log

Player statistics

Player Statistics Citation:

Awards and records

Transactions

References

See also
 1989-90 NBA season

Atlanta Hawks seasons
Atlanta Haw
Atlanta Haw
Atlanta Hawks